Citra Putri Sari Dewi (born 2 August 1996) is an Indonesian-born Singaporean badminton player. Born in Jakarta, she started playing badminton at age 6, and in 2008, she was part of the Riau Islands province competed at the Indonesia National Games. She moved to Singapore to continue her studies, and graduated from the Paya Lebar Methodist Girls' School. She was the ASEAN School Games gold medalists in the mixed doubles in 2012 and in the girls' doubles in 2013.

Early life and family 
Citra Putri Sari Dewi was born in a badminton family. Her father Sugeng Subagyo was a former Indonesia national badminton player, and the owner of Nusantara badminton club in Sleman. She was the eighth of nine siblings. The first and second of the siblings are Hengky Kurniawan Saputra and Anita Kartika Sari who played in the Indonesia national event tournament. After that the twin Wandry and Hendri Kurniawan Saputra, the twin was a former Singapore national player, and now works as a coach in Malaysia and Singapore respectively. The fifth and the sixth are Hendra Wijaya and Shinta Mulia Sari who were also a former Singapore national player, then Dian Permata Sari who played in the Indonesia national event, and now works as a badminton coach in Sydney, Australia. Her younger brother Frengky Wijaya Putra is an Indonesian national doubles player.

Achievements

BWF International Challenge/Series (3 titles, 3 runners-up) 
Women's doubles

Mixed doubles

  BWF International Challenge tournament
  BWF International Series tournament
  BWF Future Series tournament

References

External links 
 

1996 births
Living people
Sportspeople from Jakarta
Indonesian female badminton players
Indonesian emigrants to Singapore
Naturalised citizens of Singapore
Singaporean people of Javanese descent
Singaporean female badminton players